Daudzese Parish is an administrative unit of Aizkraukle Municipality, Latvia. From 2009 until 2021 it was part of the former Jaunjelgava Municipality (prior to the 2009 administrative-territorial reforms of Aizkraukle District). As of 2011 the population of Daudzese Parish stood at 1140 people. Latvian law defines Daudzese Parish as a part of the region of Selonia.

Towns, villages and settlements of Daudzese Parish 
Daudzese
Daudzeva

References

Parishes of Latvia
Aizkraukle Municipality
Selonia